Éric Assadourian (born on 24 June 1966) is a former professional footballer who played as a striker. As of 2020, he is the head of the academy of Lens.

Born in France, he played for the Armenia national team, participating in 12 international matches and scoring 3 goals after making his debut on 5 October 1996 in an away 1998 World Cup qualification match against Northern Ireland.

Coaching and management career
After retiring, Assadourian worked for Stade Brestois 29 and RC Lens in the youth sectors. From 2005 until 2011, he had different roles at Lens including managing the U18 squad and senior reserve team.

From June 2012 to June 2014, he worked for Qatari club Al-Duhail also in the youth sector. He then returned to Stade Brestois 29 and became manager of their U19's. In June 2019, he was appointed manager of Stade Rennais' U19 squad and responsible for the youth sector. However, after four months, he decided to resign from the positions. 

In January 2020, he returned to Lens as head of the club's academy.

Honours

Toulouse
 Division 1 third place: 1986–87

Guingamp
 UEFA Intertoto Cup: 1996
 Coupe de France finalist: 1996–97

International goals

References

External links

1966 births
Living people
People from Saint-Maurice, Val-de-Marne
Footballers from Val-de-Marne
Association football forwards
Armenian footballers
Armenia international footballers
French footballers
French people of Armenian descent
Citizens of Armenia through descent
Armenian expatriate footballers
Ligue 1 players
Ligue 2 players
Championnat National players
Toulouse FC players
Lille OSC players
Olympique Lyonnais players
En Avant Guingamp players
Louhans-Cuiseaux FC players
AS Beauvais Oise players
ASOA Valence players
INF Vichy players